Bell Building may refer to:

Bell Building (Montgomery Alabama), listed on the National Register of Historic Places
Old Republic Building, Chicago, Illinois, a Chicago landmark originally known as the "Bell Building"
Indiana Bell Building

See also
Bell Telephone Building (disambiguation)